Mauro Martini Raccasi (Parma, Italy, October 21, 1959) is an Italian novelist, screenwriter and journalist.

He divides his time between his city and France and makes happily coexist his passion for romance and love for cinema. He was the first person in Italy to take a degree in Economics at the IFOR Institute of the Bocconi University in Milan presenting a thesis on journalism. Then, being a Jack of dozens of sad trades with Swedish and German companies before addressing himself to literature and cinema. He fractured his spine falling from a motorbike in the autumn of 2000, risking both death and paralysis. One hundred days of pain and sleeplessness. Eighteen months of rehabilitation. Plenty of time to start serious writing. He signed historical screenplays and published historical fiction serial translated abroad, action-thriller novels, children's books, illustrated books, authorized biographies. He has held the position of Press Office, wrote journalistic contents contributions for many books and press articles of various kinds. For his fiction, he coined his own trademark, the rule of the three A's: Action, Adventure and (love) Attraction.

He is also teacher in a creative writing school and juror in literary prizes.

Works 

 Il Romanzo dei Celti - La spada del druido (Piemme-Mondadori, 2004) (The Celtic Novels - The Druid's Sword
 Il Romanzo dei Celti - Il regno di Conan (Piemme-Mondadori, 2005) (The Celtic Novels – Conan’s Kingdom
 Il Romanzo dei Celti - Il guerriero di Stonehenge (Piemme-Mondadori, 2006) (The Celtic Novels - The Warrior of Stonehenge)
 Il Romanzo dei Celti - I guerrieri dei fiordi  (Piemme-Mondadori, 2007) (The Celtic Novels – The Fjords Warriors
 Auricchio 1877-2007 (2007)
 Guida Artistica di Parma (Edizioni Electa, 2007) (An Artistic Guide to Parma) 
 Forst (2009) 
 Il Diamante è per Sempre (2009)  (The Diamond is forever) 
 Codice Haggard (Asengard, 2010) (Haggard Code
 TomTom e il Re Scorpione (ELI-La Spiga, 2011) (TomTom and the Scorpion King)
 Storie con i Fiocchi (ELI-La Spiga, 2011) (Slap-up Stories)
 TomTom e i Predoni Vichinghi (ELI-La Spiga, 2012) (TomTom and the Viking Marauder) 
 Rats (2013) 
 Il Mistero del Tortellino Mannaro (ELI-La Spiga, 2012) (The Mystery of the Ware-Tortellino
 The Vikings - Episode 1 - Viking Dawn (screenplay co-writer for Fact TV UK & Millstream UK, 2015)
 The Vikings - Episode 2 - Viking Kingdom (screenplay co-writer for Fact TV UK & Millstream UK,  2015)
 The Vikings - Episode 3 - Eastern Promise (screenplay co-writer for Fact TV UK & Millstream UK,  2015)
 The Vikings - Episode 4 - Viking Weapons (screenplay co-writer for Fact TV UK & Millstream UK,  2015)
 The Vikings - Episode 5 - Raiders and Explorers (screenplay co-writer for Fact TV UK & Millstream UK,  2015)
 20.000 Leghe sotto i mari (ELI-La Spiga, 2016) (20.000 Leagues under the Sea )
 Le Avventure di Sherlock Holmes (ELI-La Spiga, 2018) (The Adventures of Sherlock Holmes )
 Parmigiani per Sempre (Edizioni della Sera, 2022) (To be Parmesan Forever)

Notes

External links
  Official Website (EN|IT)
 Mauro Martini Raccasi Official/Personal Facebook Page 
 Celtic Corner - edited by Mauro Raccasi on Irlandia.it
  Mauro Raccasi - Authors, on ELI-La Spiga - Albero dei Libri

Living people
1959 births
21st-century Italian novelists
Italian journalists
Italian male journalists
Italian screenwriters
Italian male screenwriters
Writers from Parma
21st-century Italian screenwriters